Schepers Bosman is a Dutch fashion designer duo consisting of Sanne Schepers (born 1989, Heerlen, The Netherlands) and Anne Bosman (born 1988, Amsterdam, The Netherlands).

Background 
Sanne Schepers and Anne Bosman both graduated with honors in 2011 from ArtEZ University of Arts in Arnhem, BA fashion design. Their graduation collections were awarded with various fashion prizes.
 Schepers continued her studies at the Institut Français de la Mode (IFM) in Paris. She was selected by the team of Robert Clergerie to specialize her studies further at l’Ēcole-de-Style in Romans-sur-Isère. Bosman graduated from Central Saint Martins London, MA Menswear. They gained work experience at Clergerie, Christopher Kane, Viktor & Rolf and Alexander van Slobbe, before starting their designer duo collaboration named Schepers Bosman in 2017.

The duo presented their debut collection at the 26th edition of the Amsterdam Fashion Week in 2017. Shortly thereafter they won the Mercedes-Benz Les Etoiles Award on the eve of the Paris fashion week, the jury consisted of Alexis Mabille and Dita von Teese among others.

All Schepers Bosman collections and garments are designed, developed and produced in the Netherlands. New collection presentations and sales take place during the menswear fashionweeks in Paris.

Style
Schepers and Bosman simply makes strong collections that are original, surprising and extremely well made. Cool items with raw, visible seams and a wide fit. The collection is packed with regal silhouettes, but the oversized shirts are a standout, both in shape and design. Denim was and is their showstopper. Striking an even balance between streetwear and luxe, stand out pieces include the re-designed workwear and suits along with the patchwork-heavy jumpsuits and trousers. The sleek and playful silhouettes are then dressed in vibrant color palettes of pinks, blues and purples, while darker tones are featured heavily on the outerwear looks.

Awards 
 2021 – Dutch Design Awards (Nominee) 
2017 – Mercedes-Benz Les Etoiles Award
 2012 – H&M Design Award Peoples Choice Award
 2012 – H&M Design Award The Netherlands
 2011 – Lichting Talent Award

Collaborations 
 Schepers Bosman for Royal Auping – Royal Auping x Schepers Bosman (2020)
 Schepers Bosman for Hacked By – Hacked By_ x Schepers Bosman (2020)
 Schepers Bosman for Pinqponq – pinqponq x Schepers Bosman (2019)

Exhibitions 

 2021 – ‘’Dutch Design Week’’, group exhibition, MicroLab, Eindhoven
 2021 – ‘’Maison Amsterdam’’, group exhibition, Nieuwe Kerk, Amsterdam
 2021 – ‘’CONSUMPTION’’, group exhibition, FDFA Arnhem, Arnhem
 2018 – ‘’WOW Fashion Inside Out’’, group exhibition, We Make The City, Amsterdam
 2018 – ‘’Schuit@Qade’’, group exhibition, Art Rotterdam, Cruise Terminal, Rotterdam
 2017 – ‘’Schuit - Stijl Ontkleed’, group exhibition, FDFA Arnhem, Arnhem

References

External links 
 

Dutch designers
Dutch fashion designers